Les mauvaises rencontres is a 1955 French drama film directed by Alexandre Astruc and starring Anouk Aimée. It tells the story of an ambitious journalist who has sacrificed her emotional life for the sake of her career. The story is told through flashbacks during a police interrogation. The film is based on the novel The Cautious Maiden by Cécil Saint-Laurent. Filming took place from 7 March to 7 May 1955.

The film was shown in competition at the 16th Venice International Film Festival and won the award for Most Promising New Director. It was released in France on 21 October 1955.

Cast
 Anouk Aimée as Catherine Racan 
 Jean-Claude Pascal as Blaise Walter  
 Philippe Lemaire as Alain Bergère 
 Gaby Sylvia as Hélène Ducouret 
 Claude Dauphin as Doctor Jacques Daniéli
 Giani Esposito as Pierre Jaeger
 Yves Robert as Inspector Forbin 
 Michel Piccoli as an Inspector

References

External links

1955 films
Films about journalists
Films based on French novels
Films directed by Alexandre Astruc
Films set in Paris
French drama films
1950s French-language films
Films with screenplays by Roland Laudenbach
Films based on works by Jacques Laurent
1955 drama films
French black-and-white films
1950s French films